The 2007–08 Nemzeti Bajnokság II was Hungary's the 57th season of the Nemzeti Bajnokság II, the second tier of the Hungarian football league system.

League table

Western group

Eastern group

See also
 2007–08 Magyar Kupa
 2007–08 Nemzeti Bajnokság I
 2007–08 Nemzeti Bajnokság III

References

External links
  
  

Nemzeti Bajnokság II seasons
2007–08 in Hungarian football
Hun